Elachista epartica is a moth of the family Elachistidae. It is found in Australia.

The wingspan is 10.6-10.8 mm for females. The forewings are pale bluish grey.

References

Moths described in 2011
epartica
Moths of Australia